Edwards Coaches is a family-owned coach company based in Llantrisant, near Pontypridd in South Wales.

History

In 1925 Edwards Coaches was founded by George Edwards. Over recent years, the company has expanded by acquiring several smaller local firms. Today, their fleet consists mainly of single decker coaches used for holiday tours and private hire but they also have a number of double-decker buses primarily for school contracts and park and ride services. Edwards Coaches carry around 7,100 students to school every day and around 80,000 customers on holidays each year. A small fleet of service buses is maintained to operate a group of local bus services.

On 7 January 2011, Swansea based coach holiday operator Diamond Coach Holidays went into administration. In the week after Diamond collapsed, Edwards took over £1m in holiday bookings (many of these from ex Diamond customers). On 25 January 2011, after talks with administrators PricewaterhouseCoopers, Edwards Coaches agreed to buy the firm becoming the largest coach holiday operator in Wales In 2016, as Silcox Coaches of Pembroke Dock were going out of business, Edwards took over their school contracts and some of their bus services. The local bus services however did not last long and have since been retendered.

During the 2021 Go North West strike, Edwards Coaches was one of a number of bus operators who provided vehicles and drivers to operate services on behalf of Go North West along with Selwyns Travel and Midland Classic.

National Express
Edwards Coaches are a National Express contractor and as of June 2019 operate services on routes:
040 Bristol – London
041 Bristol – Bath – Chippenham – London (Fri/Sun only, via Heathrow on return journey)
200 Bristol – Reading – Heathrow – Gatwick
201 Swansea – Cardiff – Newport – Bristol (some journeys) – Reading – Heathrow – Gatwick – Brighton
202 Swansea – Cardiff – Newport – Bristol – Heathrow Airport
216 Cardiff – Newport – Bristol Airport
302 Bristol – Bath – Chippenham – Swindon – Oxford – Northampton
320 Cardiff – Newport – Worcester – Birmingham – Derby – Chesterfield – Sheffield – Leeds – Bradford
321 Birmingham – Derby – Sheffield – Leeds – Bradford
330 Penzance – Camborne – Newquay – Plymouth – Bristol – Worcester – Birmingham – Leicester – Loughborough – Nottingham
337 Paignton – Dawlish – Exeter – Taunton – Bristol – Gloucester – Cheltenham – Stratford-upon-Avon – Warwick – Leamington Spa – Coventry – Rugby
339 Westward Ho! – Bideford – Barnstaple – Tiverton – Taunton – Bridgwater – Bristol – Cheltenham – Birmingham – Leicester – Lincoln – Newark – Grimsby
345 Cardiff – Newport – Bristol – Birmingham
401 Stroud – Cirencester – Swindon – Heathrow – London
402 Frome – Trowbridge – Melksham – Devizes – Marlborough – Hungerford – Newbury – Heathrow – London
403 Street – Wells – Shepton Mallet – Bath – Corsham – Chippenham – Heathrow – London
502 Ilfracombe or Westward Ho! or Bideford – Barnstaple – Tiverton – Taunton – Bridgwater – Heathrow – London
507 Swansea – Cardiff – London
508 Haverfordwest – Pembroke – Carmarthen – Swansea – Cardiff – Reading – London
509 Cardiff – Newport – London
510 Cardiff – Newport – London (Fri/Sun only, via Heathrow on return journey)
528 Haverfordwest – Pembroke – Carmarthen – Swansea – Cardiff – Birmingham – Stoke-on-Trent – Manchester – Rochdale
672 Swansea – Cardiff – Newport – Bristol – Minehead Butlins (Summer time only)

From May 2017, Edwards commenced operating more National Express services previously operated by South Gloucestershire Bus & Coach from a new depot in Avonmouth.

Fleet
As at October 2014, the fleet consisted of 225 buses and coaches.

References

External links

Company website

Bus operators in Wales
Coach operators in Wales
1925 establishments in Wales